Hämeentie is the second longest street in Helsinki, Finland, and among its major thoroughfares. Hämeentie is a multi-lane street beginning at the Hakaniemi square in Siltasaari, and ending near Vanhankaupunginkoski on Koskelantie.

Old streets were made into main roads in the 1850s, and the eastern one was named Itäinen Viertotie (Swedish: Östra Chaussén) from 1909 to 1928. It was one of Helsinki's main entryways, the other being Läntinen Viertotie (Swedish: Västra Chaussén), from 1942 named Mannerheimintie. True to its name, Hämeentie originally formed the starting part of a main road leading from Helsinki to Hämeenlinna, travelling through the districts of Viikki, Malmi (nowadays Kirkonkyläntie) and Hyrylä.

There is fairly little personal car traffic on Hämeentie, because most of it has been directed to the Sörnäisten rantatie street running nearby. Hämeentie is an important route for public transport. Almost all local buses in the Helsinki Metropolitan Area towards Lahdenväylä and Tuusulanväylä run along it. Hämeentie also has tram traffic from Hakaniemi to Arabia, where the Helsinki tram line 6 turns from Arabiankatu to the right towards its endpoint, in front of the University of Art and Design on Kaj Franckin aukio. Near the start of Hämeentie, the tram lines 1(A) (Käpylä) and 3B/T (Alppila) turn to the left to Siltasaarenkatu (Linjat).

References 

Streets in Helsinki